The  is an office skyscraper located in Shinjuku, Tokyo, Japan.

In front of the tower, a red "LOVE" sculpture by Robert Indiana is installed.

External links
  

Skyscrapers in Shinjuku
Skyscraper office buildings in Tokyo
Office buildings completed in 1995